MOL Campus is a neomodern skyscraper and the headquarters of MOL Group, currently built  in Budapest, Hungary, designed by Foster and Partners. The tower is the tallest building in Budapest and in Hungary. MOL Campus is estimated to be completed by 2022. It integrates a 30-storey tower with a podium a single form to create a unified campus.

References 

Buildings and structures in Budapest